The High Speed Scene is the self-titled third release and debut studio album by power pop band The High Speed Scene.  It was released on March 22, 2005 by Star Trak and Interscope records. "The Iroc-Z Song" was featured in the video game MVP Baseball 2005. "Allaboutit" was featured in the video game MLB 2006.

Track listing
For the Kids (2:12)
Assingear (2:27)
The Iroc-Z Song (3:21)
Hottie (3:14)
Fuck and Spend (1:28)
In the Know (3:13)
Hello Hello (2:40)
Crazy Star (2:56)
Last Chance (3:36)
Revolutionary Fervor (2:13)
Allaboutit (2:56)
All Swans (2:34)

Personnel 
 Max Hart - lead vocals, guitar, art direction, drawings, producer
 Domen Vajevec - bass
 Adam Aaronson	- drums
 Dana Gumbiner - vocals, producer (as Dana Deathray)
 Loic Villepontoux - MC
 Chad Hugo - executive producer
 Rob Walker - executive producer
 Pharrell Williams - executive producer
 Alex Lake - art direction, photography
 Clint Roth - engineer, producer
 Joe Barresi - engineer
 Andrew Alekel - assistant engineer
 George Marino - mastering
 Clif Norrell - mixing
 Joe Peluso - assistant engineer, mixing assistant
 Ariel Chobaz - assistant
 Seth Friedman - A&R
 Martin Kierszenbaum - A&R
 Jerry Ray Johnson - drum technician
 Ami Spishock - product manager

References 

Star Trak Entertainment albums
2005 albums
The High Speed Scene albums